There are about 275 waterfalls in the U.S. state of West Virginia.

Surface waterfalls

Underground waterfalls
Many of the state's subterranean waterfalls far exceed the surface falls in height.

See also 
 List of West Virginia-related topics

References

Citations

Further reading
Adams, Kevin (2002), Waterfalls of Virginia and West Virginia: A Hiking and Photography Guide; Menasha Ridge Press.
Rehbein, Ed and Randall Sanger (2011), West Virginia Waterfalls: The New River Gorge; Terra Alta, West Virginia: Headline Books, Inc. [Photographs]
Hartigan, Rick (2017), West Virginia Waterfalls, Nature Trek Publishing, LLC, [Directory with directions, GPS, maps, & photographs]

External links
West Virginia WaterFalls (Map) @ Great Lakes Waterfalls & Beyond
West Virginia Waterfalls (Map) @ West Virginia Waterfalls website.  http://wvwaterfalls.com/

West Virginia
Waterfalls